Torrebesses is a municipality in the comarca of the Segrià in Catalonia, Spain.

This town has lost population since year 1877 when it had 944 inhabitants.

Demography

See also
Battle of Almenar

References

External links

 Pàgina web de l'Ajuntament
 Torrebesses tourism website 
 Government data pages 

Municipalities in Segrià
Populated places in Segrià